Miklós Sirokay de Siroka, in Romania known as  (? - 1355/58) was a voivode of Transylvania under the King of Hungary.

His family descends, like 18 others, from the Hungarian noble clan of Aba (Genus Aba). They are: Báthory de Gagy, Bethlen de Iktár, Lipóczy, Nekcsey, Keczer, Kompolthy, (Chyrke), Csobánkafy, Berthóty, Rhédey (Cente), Vendéghy, Hedry, Karácsonyi, Sirokay, Somosy, Omód and Vitézy.

Being a member of the old Hungarian aristocratic family Aba of the Szalác-line, Miklós Sirokay, son of Petőcz (modern: Petőc), appears for the first time in historiography in 1338, as Royal Advocate. In the same year he becomes Lord of Castle of Diósgyőr.

In 1342, after his promotion to the King's Chamberlain, he was also made Voivod of Transylvania.
In 1344, though, Louis I the Great stripped him of this title but Miklós Sirokay still remained in his favour.
He reappears later in history as a member of the King's court of justice. In 1348, he is mentioned as Baron.

Literature 
 ÁLDÁSY, ANTAL: Monumenta Hungariae Heraldica, Magyar Czimeres Emléknek, III. Füzet, Magyar Tudományos Akadémia támogatásával kiadja a Magyar Heraldikai és Genealogiai Társaság, 1926, pg. 48–50.
 HÓMAN, BÁLINT/SZEKFÜ, GYULA: Magyar Történet, II. Kötet, Budapest, Királyi Magyar Egyetemi Nyomda, 1936.
 JÄGER-SUNSTENAU, HANNS: General-Index zu den Siebenmacher'schen Wappenbüchern. 1605–1961, Graz, Akademische Druck- u. Verlagsanstalt, 1964, p. 495.
 MARKÓ, LÁSZLÓ: A Magyar Állam Főméltóságai. Szent Istvántól Napjainkig. Életrajzi Lexikon, Budapest, Magyar Könyvklub, 2000, p. 292.
 SIEBMACHER, JOHANN: Siebmachers Wappenbuch, Bd. IV, Abt. 15, Adel von Ungarn IV. Der Adel von Ungarn sammt den Nebenländern der St. Stephans-Krone, Nürnberg, Verlag von Bauer & Raspe, 1891, Taf. 245.
 TÖRÖK, GYÖNGYI: Matthias Corvinus und die Renaissance in Ungarn, Schallaburg 1982, pg. 92–93.

Sources 
 Article in "A Pallas Nagy Lexikona"
 Article in "Kislexikon"
 Article in "Magyar Katolikus Lexikon"

Voivodes of Transylvania
14th-century Hungarian people
Hungarian nobility
Hungarian noble families
1350s deaths
Masters of the doorkeepers
Year of birth unknown